Queen Anne Creek is a tributary of Mill Creek, part of the Delaware River drainage basin in Bucks County, Pennsylvania. Rising just north of Fallsington, it meets with its confluence with Mill Creek in Bristol Township.

Statistics
The Geographic Name Information System I.D. is 1184538, U.S. Department of the Interior Geological Survey I.D. is 63801.

Course

Municipalities
Bristol Township
Middletown Township
Falls Township

Crossings and Bridges

See also
List of rivers of Pennsylvania
List of rivers of the United States
List of Delaware River tributaries

References

Rivers of Bucks County, Pennsylvania